Noémie Tiberi (born 13 August 1991) is a Luxembourger footballer who plays as a midfielder. She is a member of the Luxembourg women's national team.

References

1991 births
Living people
Women's association football midfielders
Luxembourgian women's footballers
Luxembourg women's international footballers